Interstate 95 (I-95) is a part of the Interstate Highway System that runs along the East Coast of the United States from Miami, Florida, to the Canadian border in Houlton, Maine. The highway serves the cities of Lumberton, Fayetteville, Wilson, Rocky Mount, and Roanoke Rapids. The route goes through a mostly rural area of the state, avoiding most of the major metro areas of North Carolina. It forms the informal border between the Piedmont and Atlantic Plain regions of the state.

Route description

I-95 is designated a Blue Star Memorial Highway for its entire length in North Carolina. It enters the state at the South Carolina state line, just north of the South of the Border attraction and just to the south of the town of Rowland. Traveling mostly northeasterly from the border, the freeway is joined in an overlap with US Highway 301 (US 301) at exit 10, and then I-95/US 301 intersects I-74 in Lumberton. On the north side of town, US 301 leaves at exit 22. From there, I-95 turns due northward through a rural area of the state, past the small farming community of St. Pauls. I-95 serves as the eastern bypass of Fayetteville where I-95 Business (I-95 Bus.), an older alignment, connects I-95 to downtown Fayetteville.

I-95 intersects I-40 in Benson, US 264 in Wilson, and US 64 in Rocky Mount, three of the main east–west routes in the eastern part of the state. The last city it passes is Roanoke Rapids before leaving the state near the unincorporated community of Pleasant Hill at the Virginia border. For most of the route, I-95 is paralleled closely by US 301. Besides the overlap with US 301 between exits 10 and 22, there are interchanges with US 301 at exits 1, 25, 40, 56, 90, and 107.

Services
The North Carolina Department of Transportation (NCDOT) operate and maintain two welcome centers and six rest areas along I-95. Welcome centers, which have a travel information facility on site, are located at milemarkers 5 (northbound) and 181 (southbound); rest areas are located at milemarkers 47 (north and southbound), 99 (north and southbound), and 142 (north and southbound). Common at all locations are public restrooms, public telephones, vending machines, picnic areas, and barbecue grills.

The North Carolina Department of Public Safety (NCDPS) operate and maintain four truck inspection/weigh stations along I-95. The Robeson County stations are located on both north- and southbound at milemarker 24, each has one fixed scale. The Halifax County stations are located on both north- and southbound at milemarker 151, each has two fixed scales.

Dedicated and memorial names
I-95 in North Carolina feature numerous dedicated or memorialized bridges, interchanges, and stretches of freeway.

 Blue Star Memorial Highway: official North Carolina honorary name of I-95 throughout the state (approved on June 13, 1980).
 Dick Fleming Freeway: official North Carolina name of I-95 from exit 95, in Smithfield, to exit 97, in Selma, in Johnston County. He is honored as being a visionary businessperson, who help spur businesses along the two exits and the establishment of Carolina Pottery Store in 1983, which later grew to become Carolina Premium Outlets (approved January 2013; dedicated March 22, 2013).
 Hector MacLean Highway: official North Carolina name of I-95 within Lumberton city limits (approved on October 3, 1997).

History

Established in 1956, as part of the Federal-Aid Highway Act of 1956, I-95 was routed along or near existing US 301 throughout the state of North Carolina. By 1961, two stretches of the Interstate opened: from mile marker 56, in Fayetteville, to milemarker 107, near Kenly; the other a small bypass near St. Pauls. In 1964, the St. Pauls section extended further south into Lumberton; while another small stretch opened from US 158, in Roanoke Rapids, to the Virginia state line. In 1969, I-95 was extended further south from Roanoke Rapids to exit 145, in Rocky Mount (later used for North Carolina Highway 4 [NC 4]). In 1973, I-95 was completed from St. Pauls to the South Carolina state line.

By the mid 1970s, I-95 had two gaps along its route in Fayetteville and Kenly–Gold Rock. In May 1978, two I-95 Bus. loops were established, both overlapping US 301, to help connect through the gaps and make I-95 appear as one continuous route throughout the state. In November 1978, the first gap to be completed was the Kenly–Gold Rock section. The final section of I-95 was completed in 1980, an easterly bypass of Fayetteville.

Tolls
The idea of tolling I-95 started in 2001 as a way to pay for improvements along the route. In 2003, state officials sought permission from the Federal Highway Administration (FHWA) for a plan that would cost $3 billion (equivalent to $ in ) and put tollbooths every  along the entire route. However, this was quickly killed by Governor Mike Easley, who did not support tolls.

In 2006, when the Virginia General Assembly passed the resolution calling for an interstate compact to build a toll highway, North Carolina was asked to join in on the compact of putting tolls along the entire length of I-95 in both states. Again, this was stopped by Easley, who did not see the benefit in such a compact and reiterated his opposition of tolls along I-95.

In 2010, North Carolina leaders revived talks on tolling I-95, submitting a request to the FHWA to toll the entire route. Approval would be considered after an environmental assessment and other conditions. Support has grown in a number of factors including the fact that the Interstate is mostly rural and used predominantly by out-of-state drivers.

On January 20, 2012, NCDOT received final approval of the environmental assessment for improvements along I-95 in North Carolina. The following recommendations were made:
 Widen I-95 to eight lanes (four lanes in each direction) from exit 31 to exit 81;
 Widen the remaining sections of I-95 to six lanes (three lanes in each direction);
 Make necessary repairs to pavement;
 Raise and rebuild bridges;
 Improve interchanges; and
 Bring I-95 up to current safety standards for Interstates.
It is estimated to cost $4.4 billion (equivalent to $ in ) with recommendation that it should be paid through tolls. Construction would begin in two phases: phase 1 (exits 31–81) would begin in 2016 with tolls starting after completion; phase 2 would begin in 2019, which covers the remainder of the Interstate. With a possible 2019 start date for the tolls, NCDOT plans to install nine overhead toll collection sensors every  with additional toll collection sensors at exits before tolls (to reduce drivers from jumping off and on at each toll); main toll stations will charge  each while exit tolls will charge  each. Gaps along the route, where no toll collectors are located, will allow local traffic to utilize the Interstate toll free. Drivers that do not carry a toll transponder (i.e., NC Quick Pass) will have their license numbers recorded by cameras and will be billed by mail, at a higher toll rate.

, a share of $147 million (equivalent to $ in ) in federal grant money provided by the Trump administration was being used to partially fund upgrades to I-95.

Future
, the entirety of I-95 is designated for widening from four lanes to either six or eight lanes. The project is being undertaken in several stages, with projects that, have been funded and are in various stages of completion, covering the route from milemarker 13 near Lumberton to milemarker 81 north of Fayetteville.

Begun in January 2020, a project is under way to expand I-95 from four to eight lanes between exits 55 and 71, north of Fayetteville. This includes the reconstruction of several bridges, overpasses, and underpasses both on I-95 and on crossing roads. When complete, the freeway will be a total of eight lanes through this stretch. , the project is scheduled to be completed in 2026. The project is partially funded by the Infrastructure for Rebuilding America (INFRA).

Scheduled to begin in mid-2022 is another project to widen I-95 to eight lanes from the I-74 interchange (exit 13) to exit 22. It is also expected to be completed in the middle of 2026.

The next two phases of the widening project along I-95 includes sections Cumberland and Robeson counties between exit 22 and exit 40 and in Harnett and Johnston counties between exit 71 and exit 81. , funding was expected for the Cumberland and Robeson section after 2027 and construction scheduled for the Harnett and Johnston counties section in 2026.

Exit list

Related routes
There are two auxiliary routes and one business loop in the state. I-295 connects I-95 to US 401 in Fayetteville and is planned to serve as a full bypass for I-95 in the city. I-795 connects Goldsboro to Wilson. I-95 Bus. goes through central Fayetteville.

See also

Cape Fear River
Lake Gaston
Lumber River
Neuse River
Roanoke River

References

External links

 Driving95|I-95 Corridor Planning & Financial Study
 Internatate 95 North Carolina @ SoutheastRoads.com (AARoads)

 North Carolina
95
Transportation in Fayetteville, North Carolina
Transportation in Robeson County, North Carolina
Transportation in Cumberland County, North Carolina
Transportation in Harnett County, North Carolina
Transportation in Johnston County, North Carolina
Transportation in Wilson County, North Carolina
Transportation in Nash County, North Carolina
Transportation in Halifax County, North Carolina
Transportation in Northampton County, North Carolina